Coleophora eremosparti is a moth of the family Coleophoridae. It is found in Turkmenistan and southern Russia.

The larvae feed on Eremosparton flaccidum. They create a silky case, with oblique sinuous wrinkles and without distinct longitudinal grooves. The valve is two-sided. The length of the case is 18–23 mm and it is dull or yellowish-white in color. Larvae can be found from May to June.

References

eremosparti
Moths described in 1974
Moths of Asia
Moths of Europe